Windfall is a public art work by Canadian artist Robert Murray located at the Lynden Sculpture Garden near Milwaukee, Wisconsin. The sculpture is an abstract form made of aluminum panels set at angles; it is painted bright red and installed on the lawn.

References

Outdoor sculptures in Milwaukee
1966 sculptures
Aluminum sculptures in Wisconsin
1966 establishments in Wisconsin
Abstract sculptures in Wisconsin